This is a survey of the postage stamps and postal history of New Brunswick.

Stamp issues

First issue
A total of eleven stamps were issued by New Brunswick. The first stamps were issued in 1851 and are similar in design to a contemporary set issued by Nova Scotia. This set of three diamond-shaped issues continued until 1860 when the next and final issue was released.

Decimal Issue of 1860
Commissioned by the postmaster of New Brunswick Charles Connell, the colony's second issue is notable in several ways. First, it is believed to include the first steam ship (12½ cents) and first steam train ever shown on a postage stamp (relating to the European and North American Railway, of which Mr. Connell was a director), and third because it contained the first commemorative stamp, a 17 cent stamp featuring an image of a youthful Prince of Wales (King Edward VII) wearing highland dress, issued because the Prince of Wales was scheduled to visit the colony in 1860. The most notable aspect of the issue, however, was the fact that the postmaster chose to include his own image on the five cent issue. This caused such a political uproar in the colony that Connell resigned, but not after destroying most of the stamps.<ref>J.J. MacDonald, Charles Connell and His Stamp - The Stamp's Survival, The Canadian Philatelist, September-October 2000</ref> The five cent stamp was replaced by one featuring the reigning monarch, Victoria.

New Brunswick stamps were superseded by those of the Canada when the colony became part of the Dominion on July 1, 1867.

See also
Charles Connell
List of people on stamps of the Canadian provinces
Postage stamps and postal history of Canada

 References 

Further reading
Argenti, Nicholas. The Postage Stamps of New Brunswick and Nova Scotia. London: Royal Philatelic Society London, 1962  223p. The book was reprinted by Quarterman Publications in 1976.
 Jephcott, C.M., V.G. Greene and John H.M. Young. The Postal History of Nova Scotia and New Brunswick, 1754-1867. Toronto: Sissons Publications, 1964 393p.
 
 Mitchell, Capt. R. B. Fakes & Forgeries of New Brunswick & Prince Edward Island. Halifax, N.S.: Scotia Stamp Studio, 1979 43p. 
 Poole, Bertram W. H. The Postage Stamps of New Brunswick and Nova Scotia. Beverly, MA.: Severn-Wylie-Jewett, 1920? 20p.
 Small, Richard E. New Brunswick, Canada List of Post Offices 1784-1984''. Reston, VA.: R. Small, 2001 77p.

External links
Connel Stamps - Carleton County Historical Society Inc.

Provincial symbols of New Brunswick
Philately of Canada